Michael Binzer (born 3 January 1969) is a Danish cross-country skier. He competed at the 1992 Winter Olympics, the 1994 Winter Olympics and the 1998 Winter Olympics.

References

External links
 

1969 births
Living people
Danish male cross-country skiers
Olympic cross-country skiers of Denmark
Cross-country skiers at the 1992 Winter Olympics
Cross-country skiers at the 1994 Winter Olympics
Cross-country skiers at the 1998 Winter Olympics
People from Holbæk Municipality
Sportspeople from Region Zealand
20th-century Danish people